Chiru people is a Zo ethnic group that mostly resides in Manipur and some in Assam, India.  They are listed as a Scheduled Tribe, in accordance with The Scheduled Castes and Scheduled Tribes Orders (Amendment) Act, 1976 Indian Constitution.

Population
According to the 2011 census, the population of the Chiru tribe in Manipur was 8,599.

References

External links
Manipur: Population & Development 

Scheduled Tribes of Manipur
Naga people
Ethnic groups in Northeast India